Denis Lanigan (18 May 1874 – 1 February 1933) was an Australian rules footballer who played with Collingwood, Melbourne and Carlton in the Victorian Football League (VFL). His name is also given as Dan Lanigan in some sources.

Lanigan holds a place in VFL/AFL history as the first player to compete for three clubs. His 11 appearances for Collingwood included two semi finals. He then crossed to Melbourne and played in 16 of a possible 17 games for them in the 1898 VFL season. A year later he was at another club, Carlton, with whom he made 14 appearances.

References

1874 births
VFL/AFL players born outside Australia
Irish emigrants to colonial Australia
Irish players of Australian rules football
Irish expatriate sportspeople in Australia
Collingwood Football Club players
Melbourne Football Club players
Carlton Football Club players
1933 deaths